This list of fictional rodents in literature is subsidiary to the list of fictional animals and covers all rodents appearing in printed works of literature including beavers, chipmunks, gophers, guinea pigs, hamsters, marmots, prairie dogs, and porcupines plus the extinct prehistoric species (such as Rugosodon).

Squirrels
This section exclusively lists all squirrels (flying, red, grey, sazzys, and otherwise).

Mice

Rats
This section exclusively lists all rats (domestic, barn, wharf and pack rats alike).

Other

References

Rodents in Literature
Fictional rodents
Rodents